"" (The Watch on the Rhine) is a German patriotic anthem. The song's origins are rooted in the historical French–German enmity, and it was particularly popular in Germany during the Franco-Prussian War and the First World War. The original poem was written by Max Schneckenburger during the Rhine crisis of 1840, and is generally sung to music written by Karl Wilhelm in 1854, seven years after Schneckenburger's death.

Origin 

Repeated French efforts to annex the Left Bank of the Rhine began with the devastating wars of King Louis XIV. French forces carried out massive scorched earth campaigns in the German south-west. This policy was fully implemented during the Napoleonic Wars with the creation of the Confederation of the Rhine in 1806–1813. In the two centuries from the Thirty Years' War to the final defeat of Napoleon I, the German inhabitants of lands by the Rhine suffered from repeated French invasions.

The defeat and exile of Napoleon gave the Germans some respite, but during the Rhine Crisis of 1840, French prime minister Adolphe Thiers advanced the claim that the Upper and Middle Rhine River should serve as his country's "natural eastern border". The member states of the German Confederation feared that France was resuming her annexationist designs.

Nikolaus Becker responded to these events by writing a poem called "" in which he swore to defend the Rhine. The Swabian merchant Max Schneckenburger, inspired by the German praise and French opposition this received, then wrote the poem "".

In the poem, with five original stanzas, a "thunderous call" is made for all Germans to rush and defend the German Rhine, to ensure that "no enemy sets his foot on the shore of the Rhine" (4th stanza). Two stanzas with a more specific text were added by others later. Unlike the older "" which praised a monarch, "" and other songs written in this period, such as the "" (the third verse of which is Germany's current national anthem) and "" (What is the German's Fatherland?) by Ernst Moritz Arndt, called for Germans to unite, to put aside sectionalism, sectarianism, and the rivalries of the various German kingdoms and principalities, to establish a unified German state and defend Germany's territorial integrity.

Schneckenburger worked in Restoration Switzerland, and his poem was first set to music in Bern by Swiss organist J. Mendel, and performed by tenor  for the Prussian ambassador, von Bunsen. This first version did not become very popular. When Karl Wilhelm, musical director of the city of Krefeld, received the poem in 1854, he produced a musical setting and performed it with his men's chorus on 11 June, the day of the silver anniversary of the marriage of Prinz Wilhelm von Preussen, later German Emperor Wilhelm I. This version gained popularity at later  events.

Lyrics
The following is the complete text of the original five verses, plus additions.

Usage in Germany

During the Vormärz era and the Revolutions of 1848, a Rhine romanticism movement arose, stressing the cultural and historical significance of the Rhine Gorge and the German territories on the river's left bank around the cities of Cologne, Worms, Trier and Speyer.

In response to the Ems Dispatch incident, which occurred in Bad Ems, not far from the Rhine, France initiated the Franco-Prussian War of 1870/71. When in the aftermath of the subsequent French defeat, the Prussian prime minister Otto von Bismarck achieved the Unification of Germany and the German Empire including Alsace–Lorraine was established, ""—beside ""—was the unofficial second national anthem. The song became famous, and both the composer and the family of the author were honoured and granted an annual pension by Bismarck.

The song's lyrics also appear on the 1883 Niederwald monument located just outside Rüdesheim am Rhein high above the river, epitomising the "guard on the Rhine" itself.

From World War I through to 1945, the "Watch on the Rhine" was one of the most popular songs in Germany, again rivaling the "" as the de facto national anthem. In World War II, the daily Wehrmachtbericht radio report began with the tune, until it was replaced by the fanfare from Liszt's Les préludes in 1941. The song's title was also used as the codename for the German offensive in 1944 known today as the Battle of the Bulge.

However, the scenario envisioned in the song – i.e., an enemy approaching the Rhine and seeking to cross it, and patriotic German youths mobilizing en masse to defend the river with their lives – never came about in reality. Due to the German Army's preferred offensive strategy, the fighting in 1870–71, 1914–1918 and 1940 all took place on French soil, far to the west of the Rhine. The same is true also for the German offensive in the 1944 Battle of the Bulge –  which as noted used "Watch on the Rhine" as its code name, but actually took place away from the river. In 1945 Operation Plunder did result in a successful allied crossing of the Rhine, but by then Germany was on the verge of collapse, no longer capable of this kind of mobilization.

Today, the lands along the western bank of the Rhine between Switzerland and the Netherlands are mainly part of Germany. The Saarland, Rhineland-Palatinate and North Rhine-Westphalia are German federal states; Alsace and northern Lorraine are parts of France with a German cultural element to them. The French–German enmity was ended in 1963 with the Élysée Treaty and the implementation of the Franco–German friendship, so that the danger of an invasion that loomed for centuries over both nations no longer exists. Today, the song has only historical significance in Germany and is rarely sung or played.

Stage and film
The song has figured in stage works and films.

The tune is quoted near the end of César Cui's opera Mademoiselle Fifi (composed 1902/1903), set in France during the Franco–Prussian War.

In Lewis Milestone's 1930 film All Quiet on the Western Front, the song is played at the end of the first scene as schoolboys, whipped into a patriotic frenzy by their instructor, abandon their studies and head off to enlist in the army. It is also heard in the background of the 1979 remake version of All Quiet on the Western Front when Paul (played by Richard Thomas) is preparing to board the train on his way to the front for the first time.

In Jean Renoir's 1937 film La Grande Illusion, two songs are juxtaposed in exactly the same way as in Casablanca five years later. In the latter movie, "" was sung by German officers, who then were drowned out by exiled French singing La Marseillaise (which began as the "War Song for the Army of the Rhine", written and composed at the Rhine).

The song provides the title for Lillian Hellman's cautionary pre-World War II play Watch on the Rhine (1941) and the 1943 movie based on it.

In the first and second part of Rainer Werner Fassbinder's 1980 epic film adaptation of Alfred Döblin's Berlin Alexanderplatz (1929), Franz Biberkopf starts singing the song (as in the novel).

In John Ringo's science fiction novel Watch on the Rhine (2005), cannibal alien hordes landing in France advance towards Germany, and Germans prepare to block them at the Rhine.

In the parodic science fiction film Iron Sky (2012), the Nazis living on the far side of the moon use the song's tune (with different lyrics) as their national anthem.

In François Ozon's 2016 film Franz, a portion of the song is sung by several German characters in a bar.

Adaptations
The tune for the alma mater of Yale University, "Bright College Years", was taken from Karl Wilhelm's "Die Wacht am Rhein". New lyrics to the "splendid tune" were written by Henry Durand in 1881.

The tune was used by Hotchkiss School in Lakeville, Connecticut for their hymn "Fair Hotchkiss". The tune is used by Doshisha University for its school song, "Doshisha College Song".

Italian poet Giovanni Pascoli also wrote new, patriotic lyrics to the song's tune, titled "La vedetta delle Alpi". They speak about a "guard on the Alps" (Alps play the part of the sacred boundaries, just as the Rhein river does in the original lyrics). The poem bears the subtitle "Twin anthem of the 'Wacht am Rhein'".

References

External links 

 
 
 "Die Wacht am Rhein" on ingeb.org (English)

German patriotic songs
German songs
France–Germany relations
1854 songs
1854 in Germany
Francophobia in Europe